Pedro Merino Criado (born 8 July 1987, in Manzanares) is a Spanish former professional cyclist.

Major results
2005
 1st Stage 1 Vuelta al Besaya
2008
 5th Gran Premio Inda
 8th Trofeo Franco Balestra
2009
 1st  Road race, National Under-23 Road Championships
 4th Overall Grand Prix du Portugal
2010
 9th Prueba Villafranca de Ordizia
2012
 6th Prueba Villafranca de Ordizia

References

External links
 

1987 births
Living people
Spanish male cyclists
Sportspeople from the Province of Ciudad Real
Cyclists from Castilla-La Mancha